Arnold Read (24 January 1880 – 20 May 1957) was an English cricketer. He played for Essex between 1904 and 1910. His son, Hopper Read, also played for Essex and made one Test appearance for England, in 1935.

References

External links

1880 births
1957 deaths
English cricketers
Essex cricketers
People from the London Borough of Redbridge
Cricketers from Greater London
People from Essex (before 1965)